The Deddick River is a perennial river of the Snowy River catchment, located in the Alpine region of the Australian state of Victoria.

Course and features
The Deddick River rises below Mount Little Bill in a remote alpine wilderness area within the Snowy River National Park, and flows generally north leaving the national park, then northwest through the locality of Tubbut, and then west southwest. The river is joined by the Bonang River and sixteen minor tributaries, before reaching its confluence with the Snowy River in the Snowy River National Park below Mount Bulla Bulla, a few hundred metres north of the McKillops Bridge in the Shire of East Gippsland. The river descends  over its  course.

McKillops Road is located adjacent to much of the course of the river, and traverses the river on several occasions.

The traditional custodians of the land surrounding the Deddick River are the Australian Aboriginal Bidawal and Nindi-Ngudjam Ngarigu Monero peoples.

See also

 List of rivers of Australia

References

External links
 
 
 

East Gippsland catchment
Rivers of Gippsland (region)